Arvi Assembly constituency is one of the 288 Vidhan Sabha (legislative assembly) constituencies in Maharashtra state in western India. This constituency is one of the four Vidhan Sabha constituencies in Wardha district.

Arvi is part of the Wardha Lok Sabha constituency along with five other Vidhan Sabha segments, namely Wardha, Hinganghat and Deoli in Wardha district and Morshi and Dhamangaon Railway in Amravati district.

Members of Legislative Assembly

See also
 Arvi
 List of constituencies of Maharashtra Vidhan Sabha

References

Assembly constituencies of Maharashtra
Wardha district